The Land Bank Building in Kansas City, Missouri is a building from 1923. It was listed on the National Register of Historic Places in 1985.

It was designed by architects Keene & Simpson.

It is Italian Renaissance in style.

References

Commercial buildings completed in 1923
Buildings and structures in Kansas City, Missouri
Italian Renaissance Revival architecture in the United States
Bank buildings on the National Register of Historic Places in Missouri
National Register of Historic Places in Kansas City, Missouri
Library District (Kansas City, Missouri)